Domestic Harmony is the debut studio album by Australian rock/pop group Do-Ré-Mi which was released by Virgin Records in August 1985. The album has ten tracks, which were written by lead vocalist Deborah Conway, drummer Dorland Bray, bass guitarist Helen Carter and guitarist Stephen Philip.

The single "Man Overboard" had made its first appearance on 1982's The Waiting Room EP, but was re-worked and released as a single from this album to become a top 5 hit, it included lyrics referring to anal humour, penis envy and pubic hair; and had no chorus.

At the 1985 Countdown Music Awards, the album won Best Debut Album.

The album was released in different forms for UK, German and North American markets and the Australian 1988 CD version had five bonus tracks.

Track listing
All tracks were written by Deborah Conway, Dorland Bray, Helen Carter and Stephen Philip, except where indicated.

Australian 1985 original release
"The Theme from Jungle Jim"
"After the Volcano"
"Idiot Grin"
"Cuttlefish Beach"
"Warnings Moving Clockwise"
"Man Overboard"
"Big Accident"
"Racing to Zero"
"New Taboos"
"1000 Mouths"
Bonus tracks for 1988 Australian CD release
"Black Crocodiles"
"No Fury"
"Shake this Place"
"Man Overboard" (12" version)
"Burning the Blues" (Dorland Bray)

Charts

Personnel
Do-Ré-Mi members
Dorland Bray — drums, percussion, backing vocals
Helen Carter — bass guitar, backing vocals
Deborah Conway — lead vocalist
Stephen Philip — guitar
Additional musicians
Roger Freeman — trombone
Steve Hogarth — keyboards
Recording details
Producer, engineer — Gavin MacKillop
Assistant engineer — Chris Potter, Mike Bigwood, Steve Chase
Studio — Townhouse III Studios London
 Mixing studio — Maison Rouge Studios London, Genetic Studios Reading

Art work
Cover design and illustration — Cathie Felstead
Photography — Thomi Wroblewski

References

1985 debut albums
Do-Re-Mi (band) albums
Virgin Records albums